The discography of Wire, an English rock band, consists of seventeen studio albums, twenty-six live albums, eleven compilation albums, eleven EPs, and twenty-four singles.

Albums

Studio albums

Live albums

Compilation albums

Box sets

EPs

Singles

References

External links
 Discography on Wire's official website
 

Rock music group discographies
Discographies of British artists
Discography
Punk rock discographies